The following is a list of African films. It is arranged alphabetically by country of origin.

Algeria

Angola

Benin

Botswana

Burkina Faso

Burundi

Cameroon

Cape Verde

Central African Republic

Chad

Congo, Democratic Republic of

Congo, Republic

Djibouti

Egypt

Equatorial Guinea

Eritrea

Ethiopia

Gabon

Gambia
 Welcome to the Smiling Coast: Living in the Gambian Ghetto
 Jaha's Promise

Ghana

Guinea

Guinea-Bissau

Ivory Coast

Kenya

Lesotho
 Goldwidows: Women in Lesotho 1991

Libya

Madagascar

Malawi

Mali

Mauritania

Mauritius

Morocco

 Tes Cheveux Noirs Ihsan (2006)

Mozambique

Namibia

Niger

Nigeria

Rwanda

São Tomé and Príncipe

Sierra Leone

Somalia

South Africa

South Sudan
 Jebel Nyoka
 The Nuer

Sudan

Tanzania

Togo

Tunisia

Uganda

Western Sahara

Zaire

Zambia

Zimbabwe

 Forbidden Fruit (2000)

See also

Cinema of Africa
Lists of films

References

External links
 African film at the Internet Movie Database
 African Media Program Database, Michigan State University - comprehensive database of more than 14,000 African films and videos

 
 
 
Africa